Smilin' Through may refer to:

"Smilin' Through" (song), a popular 1919 ballad
Smilin' Through (play), a 1919 Broadway play, partially rewritten to go with the song's lyrics
Smilin' Through (1922 film), an adaptation of the play, starring Norma Talmadge
Smilin' Through (1932 film), another play adaptation, featuring Norma Shearer and Fredric March
Smilin' Through (1941 film), another adaptation, with Jeanette MacDonald and Brian Aherne
Smilin' Through, a 1982 album by Cleo Laine and Dudley Moore